Moussa Gholam (born 10 June 1995) is a Moroccan professional boxer who has held the WBO Inter-Continental super featherweight title since 2019.

Early life
Gholam was born on 10 June 1995 in Larache, Morocco, where he grew up with his grandmother. He moved to Barcelona at the age of seven to join his parents, who had been living and working in Ceuta before that. Growing up in a tough neighborhood where he suffered from bullying, he began boxing to learn how to defend himself. He has been with Gallego Prada club since he started when he was eleven years old.

Professional career
Gholam made his professional debut on 1 April 2016, defeating Reynaldo Maravillas via unanimous decision (UD) at the Pabellón de la Vall d'Hebron in Barcelona. After a 10–0 start, he picked up the vacant WBC Youth Silver super featherweight title on 2 February 2019 by beating Romanian prospect Alex Rat (8–3–2, 3 KO), who did not answer the bell for the sixth round. Less than ten months later, on 30 November, he faced Thai veteran Chonlatarn Piriyapinyo (61–5, 41 KO) for the vacant WBO Inter-Continental super featherweight title, stopping him by technical knockout (TKO) in the tenth round of their 10-round bout for his second title belt. This entered him into the top 15 of the WBO rankings, placing him at #12. He was named the best foreign boxer in Spain of 2019 by Espabox.com after winning all five of his fights and two titles. He was scheduled to face Venezuelan rival Otto Gámez in March 2020, but the event was cancelled due to the COVID-19 pandemic.

Professional boxing record

Personal life
Although he has lived in Spain continuously since he was a kid, he has not been able to become a Spanish citizen.

Growing up playing football in the streets of Barcelona, Gholam is naturally a fan of FC Barcelona and he has cited Ronaldinho as his favorite footballer. Apart from boxing he also works as an ambulance driver.

References

External links
 
 Gallego Prada bio (in Spanish)

Living people
1995 births
Moroccan male boxers
Super-featherweight boxers
Moroccan emigrants to Spain
People from Larache
Boxers from Barcelona
Sportspeople from L'Hospitalet de Llobregat
21st-century Moroccan people
20th-century Moroccan people